Cooper Nunatak is a large rocky nunatak  north of Diamond Hill, protruding through the ice east of the Brown Hills. It was mapped by the Victoria University of Wellington Antarctic Expedition (VUWAE), 1962–63, and named for R.A. Cooper, geologist with the VUWAE, 1960–61.

Dot Peak is the highest point of the nunatak.

References 

Nunataks of Oates Land